Leucothrix is the scientific name of two genera of organisms and may refer to:

Leucothrix (bacterium), a genus of bacteria in the family Thiotrichaceae
Leucothrix (fly), a genus of insects in the family Tephritidae